The 2012 Cork Premier Intermediate Hurling Championship was the ninth staging of the Cork Premier Intermediate Hurling Championship since its establishment by the Cork County Board in 2004. The championship began on 27 May 2012 and ended on 7 October 2012.

On 1 September 2012, Aghabullogue were relegated from the championship following a 1-21 to 0-12 defeat by Watergrasshill.

On 7 October 2012, Ballinhassig won the championship following a 1-19 to 1-12 defeat of Bandon in the final. This was their second championship title overall and their first in seven championship seasons.

Bandon's Ronan Crowley was the championship's top scorer with 4-33.

Teams

A total of 16 teams contested the Premier Intermediate Championship, including 14 teams from the 2011 premier intermediate championship, one relegated from the 2011 senior championship and one promoted from the 2011 intermediate championship.

Team changes

To Championship

Promoted from the Cork Intermediate Hurling Championship
 Charleville

Relegated from the Cork Senior Hurling Championship
 Ballinhassig

From Championship

Promoted to the Cork Senior Hurling Championship
 Courcey Rovers

Relegated to the Cork Intermediate Hurling Championship
 Argideen Rangers

Results

Round 1

Round 2

Round 3

Relegation play-off

Round 4

Quarter-finals

Semi-finals

Final

Championship statistics

Scoring events

Widest winning margin: 17 points
Bandon 4-16 - 0-11 Aghabullogue (Round 1)
Most goals in a match: 6
Mallow 3-20 - 3-19 Newcestown (Round 2)
Bandon 4-15 - 2-12 Carrigaline (Quarter-final)
Most points in a match: 39
Mallow 3-20 - 3-19 Newcestown (Round 2)
Most goals by one team in a match: 4
Bandon 4-16 - 0-11 Aghabullogue (Round 1)
Bandon 4-15 - 2-12 Carrigaline (Quarter-final)
Most goals scored by a losing team: 3
Newcestown 3-19 - 3-20 Mallow (Round 2)
Most points scored by a losing team: 19 
Newcestown 3-19 - 3-20 Mallow (Round 2)

Top scorers

Top scorer overall

Top scorers in a single game

Miscellaneous

 Ballinhassig become the first team to win the championship more than once.

References

External links

 2012 Cork PIHC results

Cork Premier Intermediate Hurling Championship
Cork Premier Intermediate Hurling Championship